The Archdiocese of Ibadan is a Latin Church ecclesiastical territory or archdiocese of the Catholic Church in Ibadan, Nigeria.

History
 13 March 1952: Established as Apostolic Prefecture of Ibadan from the Metropolitan Archdiocese of Lagos
 28 April 1958: Promoted as Diocese of Ibadan 
 26 March 1994: Promoted as Metropolitan Archdiocese of Ibadan

Special churches
The seat of the archbishop is Saint Mary’s Cathedral in Ibadan.

Bishops
Prefect Apostolic of Ibadan (Roman rite) 
 Father Richard Finn, S.M.A., 13 March 1953 – 28 April 1958 see below
 Bishops of Ibadan (Roman rite) 
 Bishop Richard Finn, S.M.A., see above 28 April 1958 – 3 July 1974
 Bishop Felix Alaba Adeosin Job, 5 October 1974 – 26 March 1994 see below
 Metropolitan Archbishops of Ibadan (Roman rite)
 Archbishop Felix Alaba Adeosin Job, see above 26 March 1994 – 24 January 2014
Archbishop Gabriel Ojeleke Abegunrin, 24 January 2014 – present

Auxiliary Bishop
Felix Alaba Adeosin Job (1971-1974), appointed Bishop here

Other priest of this diocese who became bishop
Peter Kayode Odetoyinbo, appointed Bishop of Abeokuta in 2014

Suffragan Dioceses
 Roman Catholic Diocese of Ekiti 
 Roman Catholic Diocese of Ilorin
 Roman Catholic Diocese of Ondo 
 Roman Catholic Diocese of Osogbo 
 Roman Catholic Diocese of Oyo

See also
 Roman Catholicism in Nigeria
Anglican Province of Ibadan
Anglican Diocese of Ibadan

Sources
 Official website of the Archdiocese of Ibadan
 GCatholic.org Information
 Roman Catholic Bishops Conference of Nigeria
 Catholic Secretariat of Nigeria

References

Roman Catholic dioceses in Nigeria
Religion in Ibadan
1958 establishments in Nigeria
Roman Catholic Ecclesiastical Province of Ibadan